Amphigyra is a genus of air-breathing freshwater snail, an aquatic pulmonate gastropod mollusk in the family Planorbidae, the ram's horn snails.

Species 
The genus Amphigyra contains the following species:
 shoal sprite (Amphigyra alabamensis) - type species

Original description 
Genus Amphigyra was originally described by Henry Augustus Pilsbry in 1906.

Pilsbry's original text (the original description) reads as follows:

References 

Planorbidae
Taxonomy articles created by Polbot